Hovis Ltd is a British company that produces flour and bread. Founded in Stoke-on-Trent, it began mass-production in Macclesfield, Cheshire, in 1886. It became part of Rank Hovis McDougall (RHM) in 1962 after a succession of mergers. RHM, with its brands including Hovis and Mother's Pride, was acquired by Premier Foods in 2007.

Hovis became a limited company in April 2014, after Premier Foods sold a 51% stake in the business to The Gores Group to form a joint venture between the two companies.

In November 2020, it was announced that both the Gores Group and Premier Foods had sold their stakes in the business to British-based private equity firm Endless LLP.

Hovis specialises in high wheatgerm wholemeal flour, the bread being baked independently. It also produces the Nimble brand reduced-calorie bread.

History

The brand began in 1886; the Hovis process was patented on 6 October 1887 by Richard "Stoney" Smith (1836–1900), and S. Fitton & Sons Ltd developed the brand, milling the flour and selling it along with Hovis-branded baking tins to other bakers. The name was coined in 1890 by London student Herbert Grime in a national competition set by S. Fitton & Sons Ltd to find a trading name for their patent flour which was rich in wheat germ. Grime won £25 when he coined the word from the Latin phrase hominis vis – "the strength of man". The company became the Hovis Bread Flour Company Limited in 1898.

When the abundance of certain B vitamins in wheatgerm was reported in 1924, Hovis increased in popularity.

Advertising

In 1915, when the London and South Western Railway inaugurated their first electric train services, they introduced alphabetical head-codes in lieu of the traditional discs used on steam locomotives so that the general public could more easily identify their train. A 1926 advertisement widely deployed on the railways showed five such trains carrying headcodes H ō V I S along with an explanation (H-Hampton Court, ō-Hounslow, V-Kingston [V for Thames Valley], I-Dorking North & Effingham, and S-Shepperton). The fact that the "clockwise" Hounslow Loop head-code was a slightly height-reduced 'O' topped by a bar led to the rendering of the brand as HōVIS – a rendering that significantly outlasted the advertising campaign.

In 1973, Hovis ran a television advertisement, Boy on the Bike, written by advertising agency Collett Dickenson Pearce and filmed by CDP's photographer Jack Bankhead under the direction of Ridley Scott, who later directed Alien. The advert featured the slow movement of Antonín Dvořák's Symphony No. 9 rearranged for brass. Filmed on Gold Hill in Shaftesbury, Dorset, Scott's advert has been voted Britain's favourite advertisement of all time. An original film print was restored by the BFI in 2019 and is available on their Advertising Collection.

This advertisement was repeated on British television for a 10-day run in May 2006 to commemorate the firm's 120th anniversary. The soundtrack had to be re-recorded to meet advertising standards. The boy on the bike, Carl Barlow, then aged 13, left acting and eventually became a firefighter in East Ham in 1979.

In 2008 Hovis departed from the "boy on a bike" format by commissioning Go On Lad, a retrospective advertisement documenting the 122 years of British history since the brand's launch. Go On Lad was voted "Advert of the Decade" by the British public in December 2009.

Hovis map books

Hovis Ltd. published a series of map books which included advertisements for their products.  In 1899 the company produced eight books of maps, covering England and Wales, designed for cyclists. In 1920 the company published Where to Go and How to Get There: Hovis Road Map of England, Wales and Scotland, and several versions of this book were later printed.

Hovis biscuit

Since 1980, Hovis have licensed Jacob's to produce a digestive biscuit, branded as Hovis. Now a United Biscuits product, they are shaped like a miniature flat copy of the traditional Hovis loaf, and like the bread have the word "HOVIS" stamped on their top surface.

The Bread Bag Recycling Programme 
In a bid to help the environment and sustainability, Hovis collaborated with TerraCycle in The Bread Bag Recycling Programme. The objective of the programme is to drop-off used bread bags at public drop-off locations across the UK, or mail them to delivery services like those provided by UPS. These are all listed on an interactive map. After that the bags are recycled in a specialist plant. Those who take part in the programme are able to get TerraCycle points. These can be redeemed for a variety of charitable gifts or a payment to the non-profit organisation.

References

External links

 Hovis on Facebook

 Hovis profile on Twitter

Products introduced in 1890 
Bakeries of the United Kingdom
British brands
Companies based in Buckinghamshire
Food brands of the United Kingdom
Food manufacturers of the United Kingdom
Premier Foods brands
British companies established in 1898